NA-22 Mardan-II is a constituency for the National Assembly of Pakistan. The constituency was formerly known as NA-9 (Mardan-I) from 1977 to 2018. The name changed to NA-21 (Mardan-II) after the delimitation in 2018 and to NA-22 (Mardan-II) after the delimitation in 2022.

Members of Parliament

1977–2002: NA-9 Mardan-I

2002–2018: NA-9 Mardan-I

2018-2022: NA-21 Mardan-I

Elections since 2002

2002 general election

A total of 1,722 votes were rejected.

2008 general election

A total of 1,063 votes were rejected.

2013 general election

A total of 3,558 votes were rejected.

2018 general election 

General elections were held on 25 July 2018. This constituency had the lowest margin of victory (35 votes), in all of Pakistan, this election.

See also
NA-21 Mardan-I
NA-23 Mardan-III

References

External links 
 Election result's official website

21
21